Cum  may refer to:

 a Latin preposition meaning "with" 
 Antonio José de Sucre Airport, Venezuela, IATA airport code CUM
 Culham railway station, Oxfordshire, England, CUM, station code CUM
 "Cum", a song by Mykki Blanco from the 2012 EP Mykki Blanco & the Mutant Angels
 "Cum", a song by Brooke Candy featuring Iggy Azalea from the 2019 album Sexorcism
 cu m, cubic metre, a measure of volume
 A slang term for semen or ejaculation
 Female ejaculation

See also
 
 
 
 Come (disambiguation)
 Cwm (disambiguation)